Musi Triboatton is an annual international boat race held in South Sumatra, Indonesia since 2012. This race takes place along more than  stretch on the Musi River, one of the biggest rivers in Sumatra Island, from Tanjung Raya on its upper stream in western South Sumatra to the provincial capital city of Palembang, the oldest city in Indonesia. It features three water sports: rafting, canoeing, and dragon boat racing.

Stages
There are five stages in Musi Triboatton
 Stage 1 : Tanjung Raya - Tebing Tinggi
 Stage 2 : Tebing Tinggi - Muara Kelingi
 Stage 3 : Muara Kelingi - Sekayu
 Stage 4 : Sekayu - Pengumbuh
 Stage 5 : Pengumbuh - Palembang

References

http://www.justgoindonesia.com/musi-triboatton/

Rowing competitions in Indonesia
Sport in South Sumatra